Jacky Fleming (born 1955, London) is an English cartoonist, whose work first became known through her pre-internet social activism postcards.

Biography
Fleming studied a foundation course at the Chelsea School of Art, followed by a Fine Art degree at the University of Leeds. Her first published cartoon appeared in Spare Rib, and was a university essay for Professor Griselda Pollock which she handed in as a cartoon strip, and was about a girl trying to understand what society wants from her. Since then her work has featured in many books, exam papers, and publications which include The Guardian, The Independent, New Statesman, New Internationalist, Red Pepper, The Observer, Diva, You and Big Issue.

Fleming's book about Charles Darwin's theory of female inferiority was the winner of the Artemisia Humour prize for The Trouble with Women.

Bibliography
 The Trouble with Women, 2016.
 Demented, Bloomsbury, 2004
 Hello Boys, Penguin, 1996
 Dear Katie, Penguin, 1994
 Falling In Love, Penguin, 1993
 Never Give Up, Penguin, 1992
 Be A Bloody Train Driver, Penguin, 1991

Exhibitions
 Panel Show, Sunny Bank Mills, Leeds, 2019
 Une BD si je veux, quand je veux!, Maison Fumetti, Nantes, France, 2018
 A Woman's Place, Abbey House Museum, Leeds, 2018
 A Woman's Work is Never Done, Quarry Bank Mill, Styal, 2017
 WOW - Women of the World Festival, Hull, March 2017 - "...commissioned portraits of Hull Trailblazers alongside work from her recent book the Trouble With Women.”
 Comix Creatrix: 100 Women Making Comics, House of Illustration, London, 5 Feb – 15 May 2016 - “The laughter panels, which included excerpts from Jacky Fleming's new book, 'The Trouble with Women' and Lizz Lunney's 'True Story', had many visitors chuckling out loud to themselves."
 Wish You Were Here? Artists postcards from 1960 to today, Arena Gallery, Birmingham, May 2015 – June 2016
 Washburne Heritage Centre, Fewston October 2014
 The Postcard is a Public Work of Art, X Marks the Bokship, Group Show, Bethnal Green, 2014
 Shrewsbury Cartoon Festival 2011
 Never Give Up, Bradford Playhouse, March 2009
 The Salt Gallery, Hayle, Cornwall, April 2007
 Fawcett's Funny Girls, London, Manchester, Glasgow 1997
 Pankhurst Trust, Manchester 1997
 London Comedy Festival, Riverside Studios, London 1994
 The Cutting Edge, Barbican Centre, London 1992
 Leeds City Art Gallery, 1992
 She Bites, Eastthorpe Gallery, Mirfield 1992
 Le Donne Ridono, Ferrara

References

External links
 Jacky Fleming website
 United agents author entry
 Interviewed by Jane Garvey for Womens Hour, Feb 2016

1955 births
Living people
20th-century English women artists
21st-century English women artists
Alumni of the University of the Arts London
Alumni of the University of Leeds
Artists from London
British cartoonists